Tamás Pomucz (12 June 1957 – 31 July 2020) was a Hungarian sailor. In 1989, together with Béla Argay he won the gold medal at the European Championships in Balatonfüred in the Flying Dutchman event. He competed in the Flying Dutchman event at the 1992 Summer Olympics. He later became a coach and federal captain.

References

External links
 

1957 births
2020 deaths
Hungarian male sailors (sport)
Olympic sailors of Hungary
Sailors at the 1992 Summer Olympics – Flying Dutchman
People from Siófok
Sportspeople from Somogy County